Sir Hubert Ashton  (13 February 1898 – 17 June 1979) was an English first-class cricketer, footballer and politician.

Biography

Early life
Ashton was born in Calcutta, India on 13 February 1898. Ashton's mother, Victoria Alexandrina Inglis, was the daughter of Sir John Eardley Wilmot Inglis, who commanded the British forces at the Siege of Lucknow, and Julia Selina Thesiger.

Ashton was educated at Winchester College; on leaving Winchester in 1916 he joined the Royal Field Artillery and served for the rest of World War I. He was awarded the Military Cross "for conspicuous gallantry and skill in leading a section of guns into a forward position near Trones Wood on 27th August, 1918, where, under heavy shell and machine-gun fire, he succeeded in destroying an enemy strong point, thereby greatly facilitating the infantry advance." After the war he went up to Trinity College, Cambridge.

Cricket career
As a cricketer, Ashton was a sound right-hand batsman in the outstanding Cambridge University sides in the years just after the First World War, in which he had been commissioned in the Royal Field Artillery and won the Military Cross, and he played for Essex in the vacations. In both 1921 and 1922 he scored more than 1,000 runs and at the end of the 1922 season, after just three years in first-class cricket, Ashton was averaging more than 46 runs per innings. His most famous exploit, though, was as a member of the amateur side assembled by Archie MacLaren to take on the hitherto-invincible 1921 Australian cricket team at Eastbourne. Bowled out for just 43 runs in the first innings, the so-called "England XI" were, at 60 for four wickets in their second innings, still 71 behind when Ashton was joined by Aubrey Faulkner. Ashton hit 75 in 72 minutes, Faulkner made 153 and McLaren's side won the match by 28 runs. Ashton was named as a Wisden Cricketer of the Year in 1922 largely on account of this innings. Ashton was involved in an extraordinary incident during the match against Lancashire. He was bowled, but both bails went up in the air and then returned to their grooves on top of the stumps, meaning that he was not out.

Ashton's three brothers, Gilbert, Percy and Claude, also played first-class cricket; Gilbert, Hubert and Claude captained Cambridge University in the three consecutive seasons from 1921 to 1923.

At the end of the 1922 cricket season Ashton joined the Burmah Oil Company, and his appearances thereafter were sporadic. He played for India and for Burma against the Marylebone Cricket Club (MCC) side led by Arthur Gilligan that toured India in 1926–27; he reappeared for several Essex matches in 1927; and there were a handful of first-class games across the 1930s, the last in 1939.

Football career
Ashton was also an accomplished footballer, playing as an amateur for all his footballing career, which began with the Corinthians and then, during the 1919–20 season, West Bromwich Albion. He made his only appearance in the Football League in May 1925 for Bristol Rovers against Reading. He joined Clapton Orient in August 1926, making five appearances for them during the 1926–27 season, and then joined Gillingham in May 1927 but shortly afterwards retired from football to focus on his cricketing career.

Post-cricket and political career
Ashton later pursued a different career, first in cricket administration, as president of Essex from 1941, and then in national UK politics. He served as High Sheriff of Essex in 1943 and was then elected as Conservative Member of Parliament for Chelmsford at the 1950 general elections and held the seat at three further UK general elections, before retiring in 1964. In the 1959 Birthday Honours, Ashton was appointed a Knight Commander of the Order of the British Empire (KBE) for political and public services, and it was as Sir Hubert Ashton that he became MCC president in 1960–61. Ashton died in South Weald, Essex on 17 June 1979.

Personal life
In 1927 Ashton married Dorothy Gaitskell, sister of Hugh Gaitskell. They had two sons and two daughters.

References

External links 
 
 

English cricketers
Cambridge University cricketers
Essex cricketers
Marylebone Cricket Club cricketers
Gentlemen cricketers
North v South cricketers
Free Foresters cricketers
Rangoon Gymkhana cricketers
Wisden Cricketers of the Year
Presidents of the Marylebone Cricket Club
Conservative Party (UK) MPs for English constituencies
Knights Commander of the Order of the British Empire
British Army personnel of World War I
Royal Field Artillery officers
Recipients of the Military Cross
1898 births
1979 deaths
English footballers
Corinthian F.C. players
West Bromwich Albion F.C. players
Bristol Rovers F.C. players
Leyton Orient F.C. players
UK MPs 1950–1951
UK MPs 1951–1955
UK MPs 1955–1959
UK MPs 1959–1964
English Football League players
High Sheriffs of Essex
People educated at Winchester College
Alumni of Trinity College, Cambridge
Burmah-Castrol
Cricketers from Kolkata
British sportsperson-politicians
Oxford and Cambridge Universities cricketers
Association football fullbacks
English cricketers of 1919 to 1945
C. I. Thornton's XI cricketers
British people in colonial India
Burmese cricket people
Church Estates Commissioners
Association football people awarded knighthoods
Politicians awarded knighthoods